Joel Spencer (born April 20, 1946) is an American mathematician. He is a combinatorialist who has worked on probabilistic methods in combinatorics and on Ramsey theory. He received his doctorate from Harvard University in 1970, under the supervision of Andrew Gleason. He is currently a professor at the Courant Institute of Mathematical Sciences of New York University.  Spencer's work was heavily influenced by Paul Erdős, with whom he coauthored many papers (giving him an Erdős number of 1).

In 1963, while studying at the Massachusetts Institute of Technology, Spencer became a Putnam Fellow. In 1984 Spencer received a Lester R. Ford Award. He was an Erdős Lecturer at Hebrew University of Jerusalem in 2001. In 2012 he became a fellow of the American Mathematical Society.
He was elected as a fellow of the Society for Industrial and Applied Mathematics in 2017, "for contributions to discrete mathematics and theory of computing, particularly random graphs and networks, Ramsey theory, logic, and randomized algorithms". In 2021 he received the Leroy P. Steele Prize for Mathematical Exposition with  his coauthor Noga Alon for their book The Probabilistic Method.

Selected publications 
 Probabilistic methods in combinatorics, with Paul Erdős, New York: Academic Press, 1974.
 Ramsey theory, with Bruce L. Rothschild and Ronald L. Graham, New York: Wiley, 1980; 2nd ed., 1990.
 Ten lectures on the probabilistic method, Philadelphia:  Society for Industrial and Applied Mathematics, 1987; 2nd ed., 1994.
 The strange logic of random graphs, Berlin: Springer-Verlag, 2001.
 The probabilistic method, with Noga Alon, New York: Wiley, 1992; 2nd ed., 2000; 3rd ed., 2008.
 Deterministic random walks on regular trees, American Mathematical Society, New York, 2008.
 Asymptopia, with Laura Florescu, American Mathematical Society, 2014.

See also
 Packing in a hypergraph

References

External links
Joel Spencer's Website

1946 births
20th-century American mathematicians
21st-century American mathematicians
Living people
Harvard University alumni
Courant Institute of Mathematical Sciences faculty
Graph theorists
Putnam Fellows
Fellows of the American Mathematical Society
Fellows of the Society for Industrial and Applied Mathematics